Viepri, is an Italian village in the Colli Martani of central Umbria, a frazione of Massa Martana, 7 km north of that town and another 7 km SSW of Bastardo. It has about 200 inhabitants. One of the more attractive medieval villages of Umbria, in part because of the almost exclusive use of stone in its construction, it was a fortified outpost much contested by Todi and Foligno during the Middle Ages. It is chiefly known today for the Romanesque abbey of Santa Maria in Viepri, but another medieval church, remains of its walls, and two gates also subsist.

External links
Viepri in Thayer's Gazetteer of Umbria

Frazioni of the Province of Perugia
Cities and towns in Umbria